Closest of Friends is a 1982 album recorded by Sammy Davis Jr..  It is his 53rd and last original album, released 28 years after his first.

Davis recorded the album in July 1981 at the Sound Emporium in Nashville, Tennessee.  It was produced by Larry Butler, and was Davis' first digitally recorded album.  Davis stated that the album was "country-flavoured," and promoted the album on Hee Haw.

Track listing
 "What I’ve Got in Mind" – 2:46
 "Come Sundown" – 3:20
 "Mention a Mansion" – 2:20
 "You're Gonna Love Yourself (In The Morning)" – 3:12
 "Smoke! Smoke! Smoke! (That Cigarette)" – 3:02
 "Oh Lonesome Me" – 2:38
 "We Could Have Been the Closest of Friends" – 3:14
 "(Hey Won't You Play) Another Somebody Done Somebody Wrong Song" – 3:23
 "Please Don't Tell Me How the Story Ends" – 3:26
 "The River's Too Wide" – 2:44

References

Sammy Davis Jr. albums
1982 albums